Pete Daily (May 5, 1911 – August 23, 1986) was an American swing music and dixieland jazz cornetist and valve trombonist born Thaman Pierce Daily in Portland, Indiana.

Career
Daily was the leader of Pete Daily and his Chicagoans in the 1940s and 50s. They recorded for Capitol Records, Dixie by Daily, and Pete Daily's Dixieland Band. They also recorded on the Jump and Decca labels in the 1950s.  He started his career in Chicago in 1930 playing with various bands in and around Chicago

In 1942, he moved to the West Coast and, after service in World War II, formed the Chicagoans.  He played long engagements at several Hollywood nightclubs in the 1950s including; Sardis, The Royal Room, Hangover, Mike Lyman's. Beverly Caverns and the Astors in Studio City. He continued to play during the 1970s until a stroke in 1979 forced him to retire.  His driving style on the cornet endeared him to generations of Dixieland Jazz enthusiasts.

During the filming of Pete Kelly's Blues, actor Jack Webb, the cornet-playing star of the film,  repeatedly went to the nightclub where Daily performed to study his mannerisms for his role in the film. The band which recorded the soundtrack appeared at Dixieland festivals supported by Pete Daily's band.

Family
He was married to the former Faye O'Brien (July 6, 1915 – February 3, 1973).  In 1973, Pete married his second wife Florence, who died as a result of burns received in a house fire in 1974. Over the years since his death, two women have claimed to have been married to him between 1974 and 1986, but have not produced marriage licenses or dates to support this.

He and Faye had six children: Patricia (December 9, 1936 - May 26, 2014), Dennis (dead), Maureen, and Pete (dead), Kathleen (June 11, 1938 - 2008), Tim (October 27, 1947 - 2008).

References

Dixieland cornetists
Swing cornetists
1911 births
1986 deaths
People from Portland, Indiana
20th-century American musicians